Collagen alpha-2(VIII) chain is a protein that in humans is encoded by the COL8A2 gene. Mutations of the gene are linked to posterior polymorphous dystrophy type 2.

References

Further reading

Collagens